Dionísio Silva Castro (born 22 November 1963 in Fermentões-Guimarães) is a former long-distance runner from Portugal, best known for setting the world record in the 20,000 metres on 31 March 1990, when he clocked 57:18.4 in La Flèche. Castro continued for another 943 metres in an attempt to break Jos Hermens' world record for the one-hour run as well, but missed out by one metre.
He competed for the Portuguese club Sporting Clube de Portugal.

His twin brother Domingos was also a world class athlete in the long distance events. The two of them represented their native country at the 1988 (Seoul, South Korea) and 1992 Summer Olympics (Barcelona, Spain).

Achievements
All results regarding marathon, unless stated otherwise

External links
 
 Centario Sporting 
 
 

1963 births
Living people
Portuguese male long-distance runners
Portuguese male marathon runners
Athletes (track and field) at the 1988 Summer Olympics
Athletes (track and field) at the 1992 Summer Olympics
Olympic athletes of Portugal
Portuguese twins
Twin sportspeople
Goodwill Games medalists in athletics
World record setters in athletics (track and field)
Competitors at the 1986 Goodwill Games
Sportspeople from Guimarães